Gabriel Morency (born August 10, 1970) is a Canadian sports broadcaster, who hosted the daily shows Morency and Covers Experts on Hardcore Sports Radio as well as Sports Rage on both Hardcore Sports Radio (HSR) and The Score Television Network. He was also a host on Team 1040 in Vancouver and Team 990 in Montreal. In November 2018 he launched a new show with Corey Parsons and Michelle Serpico, The Morning After on FNTSY Sports Network in New York City. He now hosts several shows for Sportsgrid TV alongside Scott Ferrall, live from the Meadowlands.

Montreal/Team 990
Morency was born in Montreal, Quebec. Before becoming a broadcaster, Morency played minor hockey and was on  his way to England to play professionally, but chose a career in  entertainment, dropping out of school to tour in a rock/metal band named Homicide.  Ultimately, he ended up in radio after a local Montreal radio talent  suggested that he get his own show.

In Montreal, Morency also wrote in the Montreal Mirror, a free press newspaper and was host of The Blue Line, a Montreal Canadiens postgame show, and Sports Line Saturday, as well as a weekly Montreal Expos Show. He hosted the show Sports Weekly before joining the Team 990 channel.

Morency placed fourth in the Montreal Readers Poll as the biggest sports  personality in the city behind only José Théodore, Saku Koivu and Vladimir Guerrero in 2005. He has placed lower in recent years.

Hardcore Sports Radio

On November 17, 2006, Morency announced that he would be leaving the Team 990 on December 1, 2006. 11 days later, he was on Hardcore Sports Radio, in Toronto, co-hosting Hardcore Football Sunday and later, hosting Sports Rage. As well, he made picks on To the Point, a television show on The Score. Morency had several regulars on his show.

Sports Rage was also known for "Road Rages", the title given to shows which were broadcast at various venues around North America where Morency and his listeners come together, usually accompanied by guest stars. Sports Rage also had regular callers, including "The Rickster", Brandon in St. Louis, Avry in Edmonton, Rocco in California, Rob in Boston, "Bruder", and "Baroni", among many others. "Cage Calls" were also a common event on the show. The most recent Cage Call was on December 23, 2008 with "The Rickster" and Drew in Nelson, BC. "Cage Calls" featured two callers who talk "smack" back and forth. Previously, when Sportsrage was on the Team 990, "Cage Call" Championships were held. Champions included The Spoiler, Johnny Powers, Mike from the Gas Station and Madness. Sports Rage also had a position of power that was given to the callers and Sports Rage staff known as the Councilman. The first councilman election was won by Eric Cohen. Later councilmen included Rickster and Avry in Edmonton who was the last known councilman when the post was vacated by Eric Cohen who replaced Rickster after he stepped down. The position was soon retired on Hardcore Sports Radio after Morency left the company.

Morency was joined by fellow The Score/Hardcore Sports Radio personality Cam Stewart on two shows by the names of Morency and Covers Experts' (Formerly Game On!) that broadcast on Hardcore Sports Radio Sirius 98. Gabe and Cam were joined by Greg Sansone during Morency, and a different member of the Covers.com website to break down the night in betting during Covers Experts. They often talked to Las Vegas Sports Insider expert Brian Blessing, who Morency gave the nicknames "Ricky Rickshaw" (from a prior incident where it was suggested he start a Rickshaw Business in Vegas) and "Kenny Rogers"(because of a caller who said the photo of him that was used looked like the singer). Covers Experts was broadcast every weekday at 6:30pm EST on The Score Television Network and Hardcore Sports Radio. Morency also appeared alongside Cam Stewart and Sarah Meehan at the last segment of the show Drive This! on Hardcore Sports Radio hosted by Richard Garner.

Departure from HSR
Morency left Sirius / The Score in November 2009 to 'go solo', and in early December, 2009 he started Morency Sports.

On November 3, 2009, it was officially announced by his superiors that Morency was let go by Score Media on a new HSR show called "The Meeting." Confidentiality agreements between Morency and the Score Media were in place when "The Meeting" was broadcasting and his superiors were unable to provide details/reasons about Morency's departure from Score Media.

Morency Sports

On December 4, 2009, Morency launched MorencySports.com. Sports Rage aired live Monday to Friday from 10 P.M. to 12 A.M. via webcast. Other shows on the site included Gametime Decisions, MMA Meltdown and Avry's Sports Show.

Morency brought a large portion of his former Sirius Radio audience with him and attracted some of his on-air talent as well. Former NFL linesman Kyle Turley was on board with Morency as was Arena Leaguer Rich 'Moose' Salzer also covered football on air with Morency for nine years.

FNTSY Sports Network

Morency is now hosting multiple shows on the network, including Game Time Decisions, which include bets and DraftKings picks, and Morency Unfiltered. In October 2018, he began hosting the morning show Carton and Friends after Craig Carton took a leave of absence from the station. Morency began hosting The Morning After in November 2018.

In August 2017, he began doing late night content on SBRpicks.com a subsidiary of Costa Rican sportsbook news and information company SBRforum.com. He's also featured on Sunday for NFL commentary with Donnie Rightside and Jeff "The Big Man on Campus" Nadu.

References

1970 births
Canadian sports talk radio hosts
People from Montreal
Living people
French Quebecers
Canadian television sportscasters